Srđan Miličević (born 2 November 1976) is a Bosnian table tennis player. He competed in the men's singles event at the 2004 Summer Olympics.

References

1976 births
Living people
Bosnia and Herzegovina male table tennis players
Olympic table tennis players of Bosnia and Herzegovina
Table tennis players at the 2004 Summer Olympics
People from Doboj
Serbs of Bosnia and Herzegovina